Erick Daniel Herrera Pelaez (born March 23, 1989), known as Erick Herrera, is a Colombian professional male squash player. He reached a career-high world ranking of 285 in August 2016.

References

External links 
 
 
 Erick Daniel Herrera Pelaez at Juegos Deportivos Nacionales

1989 births
Living people
Colombian male squash players
South American Games gold medalists for Colombia
South American Games medalists in squash
Competitors at the 2010 South American Games
Sportspeople from Bogotá
21st-century Colombian people